Rich Benoit is an American car enthusiast known for his YouTube car vlog Co-founded by Rich Benoit & Carl Hewitt, where he and members of his crew rebuild Teslas, create electric vehicles, and rebuild custom cars, called Rich Rebuilds. Benoit has been an outspoken critic for the Right to Repair on Teslas, and has spoken of Tesla's refusal to grant car service or parts to him for the purpose of repairing his used Model S. Benoit currently has an automobile repair shop called the "Electrified Garage" in New Hampshire,  in addition to one in Ocala, Florida. Benoit currently lives in Salem, Massachusetts with his wife and two children.  As of October 2022, his YouTube channel has 1.36 million subscribers.

References 

YouTube vloggers
Living people
Year of birth missing (living people)
YouTube channels launched in 2016